Viva Cabaret was a late night comedy variety television show that aired on Channel 4 in the United Kingdom from 1993 to 1994.

The series was filmed in a sound stage in West London, with the set designed to resemble a cabaret club. The programme's house band included drummer Ray Weston (of Wishbone Ash) and members of Pink Floyd's touring band.

The first episode, which debuted on 14 April 1993, was hosted by Tom Jones. Subsequent hosts included Julian Clary, Mark Lamarr, Mike McShane, Jools Holland, Mark Thomas, Eartha Kitt, Paul O'Grady as Lily Savage, and Lee Evans. Competition for slots on the show was intense, with many stars of the British alternative comedy circuit hoping to make an appearance. In addition to the show's British stars, regular international guests included Americans Greg Proops and Sandra Bernhard, and Australia's Doug Anthony All Stars.

References

External links

Channel 4 comedy
British stand-up comedy television series
British variety television shows
1993 British television series debuts
1994 British television series endings
1990s British comedy television series
Television shows shot in London
English-language television shows